United States Naval Training Station for Aviation, Marblehead was an active naval aviation facility in Marblehead, Massachusetts from 1915 to 1917, upon the opening of Naval Air Station Squantum.

See also
 List of military installations in Massachusetts

References

1915 establishments in Massachusetts
1917 disestablishments in Massachusetts
Airports established in 1915
Airports in Essex County, Massachusetts
Closed installations of the United States Navy
Defunct airports in Massachusetts
Installations of the United States Navy in Massachusetts
Military installations closed in 1917
United States home front during World War I
Marblehead
World War I airfields in the United States